GLI family zinc finger 4 is a protein that in humans is encoded by the GLI4 gene.

References

Further reading